Simon Kasimili (born 12 December 1985) is a male long-distance runner from Kenya.

Road races

References

1983 births
Living people
Kenyan male long-distance runners
Place of birth missing (living people)
20th-century Kenyan people
21st-century Kenyan people